Glossoloma herthae is a plant species in the family Gesneriaceae. A recent review has moved it out of the genus Alloplectus.

It is endemic to Ecuador.

Its natural habitat is subtropical or tropical moist montane forests.

References

  (2005): A monograph of Alloplectus (Gesneriaceae). Selbyana 25(2): 182–209. HTML abstract

herthae
Endemic flora of Ecuador
Data deficient plants
Taxonomy articles created by Polbot
Taxobox binomials not recognized by IUCN